Dorothy S. "Sue" Landske (September 3, 1937 – February 27, 2015) was a Republican member of the Indiana State Senate who represented the 6th district. Landske was Center Township Assessor from 1978 to 1984. She joined the Indiana State Senate in 1984 and served until her retirement due to health reasons in 2014. During her final term, Landske served as the Assistant President Pro Tempore.

Landske was a retired captain in the Indiana Guard Reserve.

Landske died of cancer on February 27, 2015, at the age of 77.

References

External links

1937 births
2015 deaths
People from Evanston, Illinois
People from Lake County, Illinois
Indiana University alumni
Women state legislators in Indiana
Republican Party Indiana state senators
State defense forces of the United States personnel
21st-century American women